Lukas Filip Nimb Fernandes (born 1 March 1993) is a retired Danish professional footballer who most recently played for SønderjyskE in 2018.

Career

Coaching career
After leaving SønderjyskE in September 2018, 25-year old Fernandes retired from football. He only returned to football in January 2023, when he was hired as goalkeeping coach for Danish 2nd Division side Thisted FC.

References

External links
 
 Profile at DBU

1993 births
Living people
Footballers from Copenhagen
Danish people of Portuguese descent
Association football goalkeepers
Danish men's footballers
Denmark youth international footballers
Danish Superliga players
Lyngby Boldklub players
Aarhus Gymnastikforening players
Footballers at the 2016 Summer Olympics
Olympic footballers of Denmark